Alota may refer to:
 Alota Canton, a town and surrounding district in Bolivia
 Alota (grasshopper), a genus of insects